Cougars is a Chicago-based rock band formed in 2000. 

The band signed to the New York-based label Go-Kart Records in 2003 and has embarked on several extensive US and European tours.

Cougars' music is often compared to that of The Jesus Lizard and Rocket from the Crypt.  The band avoids categorizing themselves in interviews; they've claimed to be simply "a rock band with horns"  and "a rock band making rock music."  

In 2007, the band parted ways with saxophonist Jeff Vidmont and trumpet player Mark Beening.  In 2008, it parted ways with keyboardist Sam Ambrosini. 

As of 2012, the band continues to write material for its much anticipated third studio album, Gentleman's Choice.

Band members

 Bryan Bienias - Bass Guitar
 Matt Irie - Vocals
 John McClurg - Guitar
 Brett Meingasner - Guitar
 Brian Wnukowski - Drums

Discography
 Nice, Nice (2003), Go Kart Records
 Manhandler EP (2004), Thick Records
 Pillow Talk (2005 in Europe, 2006 in North America), Go Kart Records

External links
 Cougars Official Web Site
 Cougars MySpace Page
 ConcreteWeb interview with Bryan Bienias

Rock music groups from Illinois